The 2007–08 West Virginia Mountaineers men's basketball team represented West Virginia University in the 2007-08 NCAA Division I men's basketball season. The team was coached by Bob Huggins and played their home games in the WVU Coliseum in Morgantown, West Virginia. It completed the season 26–11 (11–7 in the Big East) and lost to Xavier 79–75 (in overtime) in the Sweet Sixteen of the 2008 NCAA tournament. West Virginia finished the season ranked #17.

Roster

Schedule and results

|-
!colspan=12| Regular season

|-
!colspan=12| Big East tournament

|-
!colspan=12| NCAA tournament

Standings

References

West Virginia
West Virginia Mountaineers men's basketball seasons
West Virginia
West Virginia Mountaineers men's basketball
West Virginia Mountaineers men's basketball